Funaitees is an area in Kuwait City, located in the governorate of Mubarak Al-Kabeer in Kuwait.

Districts of Mubarak Al-Kabeer Governorate
Populated places in Kuwait